Parandak (also known as Shahrak-e Parandak) is a village in Manjilabad Rural District, in the Central District of Robat Karim County, Tehran Province, Iran. At the 2006 census, its population was 4,613, in 1,088 families.

See also
 23rd Takavar Division – based at Parandak garrison

References 

Populated places in Robat Karim County